The Mindanao shrew-rat (Crunomys melanius) is a species of rodent in the family Muridae.
It is found only in the Philippines.

References

Rats of Asia
Crunomys
Endemic fauna of the Philippines
Rodents of the Philippines
Fauna of Mindanao
Vulnerable fauna of Asia
Mammals described in 1907
Taxa named by Oldfield Thomas
Taxonomy articles created by Polbot